Eutrixopsis is a genus of flies in the family Tachinidae.

Species
 Eutrixopsis javana Townsend, 1919

References

Tachinidae
Insects of China